Shane Clifton Curry (April 7, 1968 – May 4, 1992) was an American football defensive end for the Indianapolis Colts of the National Football League (NFL). He played college football for Georgia Tech and the Miami. He was drafted in the second round of the 1991 NFL draft by the Indianapolis Colts. 

He was shot and killed outside a Cincinnati nightclub during an argument over a blocked vehicle on May 4, 1992. Artise Anderson, the 15-year-old nephew of the driver who had blocked Curry's car, was later charged and convicted of the murder. Anderson received 15 years to life, plus 3 years for a weapons charge. He served 16 years in prison and now works as a substance abuse counselor in Mansfield OH.

See also 
 List of American football players who died during their career

References

1968 births
1992 deaths
Players of American football from Cincinnati
American football defensive ends
Georgia Tech Yellow Jackets football players
Miami Hurricanes football players
Indianapolis Colts players
American murder victims
People murdered in Ohio
Deaths by firearm in Ohio
Male murder victims
 1992 murders in the United States